David Schofield may refer to:

 David Schofield (actor) (born 1951), English actor
 David Schofield (footballer) (born 1981), English footballer 

de:David Schofield
es:David Schofield